Lodi AVA is an American Viticultural Area located in the Central Valley of California, at the northern edge of the San Joaquin Valley east of San Francisco Bay. The appellation includes land in southern Sacramento County and northern San Joaquin County. It is bounded on the west by Interstate Highway 5 and to the east by the political borders for the adjacent El Dorado, Amador, and Calaveras Counties.

History

The Lodi region has been home to grape growing since at least the 1850s when wild grapes would grow down from trees along the edge of rivers.   This led some trappers to call the Calaveras River, which runs through the southern portion of the area, "Wine Creek".

Climate and geography
Lodi has a Mediterranean climate similar to that along the Mediterranean Sea, with warm days and cool nights.  The soil, unlike many other appellations, varies within the AVA, though in most places it is a deep loam that occasionally is covered with large rocks, similar to the French region of Chateauneuf du Pape.

Grapes and wines
Although the appellation is probably best known for its old vine Zinfandel, Lodi also produces a large quantity of Merlot, Chardonnay, Cabernet Sauvignon, and Sauvignon blanc.

References

External links
the Lodi, CA ("LoCA") Winegrape Commission

American Viticultural Areas of California
Geography of Sacramento County, California
American Viticultural Areas
Geography of San Joaquin County, California
1986 establishments in California